WPNG may refer to:

 WPNG (FM), a radio station (101.9 FM) licensed to Pearson, Georgia, United States
 WPNG-LP, a defunct low-power television station (channel 3) formerly licensed to Pearson, Georgia